José Tomás Errázuriz Urmeneta (November, 1856 – 1 April 1927) was a Chilean landscape painter and diplomat.

Biography
He was born in Santiago, the son of Maximiano Errázuriz Valdivieso and of Amalia Urmeneta Quiroga. He studied painting at the Academy of Painting (Santiago, Chile), where he was a student of Ernesto Kirchbach and later juggled his diplomatic work in Paris, with art classes by an otherwise unknown painter named Humbert Giroez. He married Eugenia Huici, one of the most beautiful women of her age, who was to become a patron of modernism of the 20th Century and noted interior designer, and who was a decisive influence in his work. She soon convinced him to move to Paris in 1882, where his brother-in-law Ramón Subercaseaux Vicuña was the Chilean consul.

Around 1900 the Errázurizes relocated to London. José Tomás Errázuriz fell sick with tuberculosis, spent much time in Switzerland, and eventually he and his wife became estranged. Nonetheless during this stay, he acquired for his art most of the characteristics of English painting, even though he was also a strong admirer of the French landscape tradition and painted many times the coast of Normandy, where he lived for long periods of time. A sharp observer of nature, he painted views and scenes of the European countryside full of light and color. Errázuriz never adhered to the impressionist movement of the time, even though he was a close friend and admirer of realist painters such as Giovanni Boldini and John Singer Sargent. He always gave a principal and very strict preponderance to the drawing and the composition in his work. Errázuriz was never interested in signing or selling his work, and in 1926 sent most of his paintings to Chile to be auctioned off for charity.

Selected paintings

See also
Álvaro Casanova Zenteno
Eugenio Cruz Vargas
Eugenia Errázuriz
Rafael Errázuriz Urmeneta

References

External links

Short biography 
Some examples of his works
Genealogical chart of Errázuriz family 
Google about José Tomás Errázuriz Urmeneta

1856 births
1927 deaths
J
Chilean people of Basque descent
People from Santiago
Chilean diplomats
19th-century Chilean painters
19th-century Chilean male artists
Chilean male artists
20th-century Chilean painters
Chilean male painters
Male painters
20th-century Chilean male artists
Academy of Painting (Santiago, Chile) alumni